Sidi Bouzid, Algeria is a town and commune in Laghouat Province, Algeria. According to the 1998 census it has a population of 3864.

External links

References

Communes of Laghouat Province